In mathematics, particularly the field of calculus and Fourier analysis, the Fourier sine and cosine series are two mathematical series named after Joseph Fourier.

Notation

Sine series
If  is an odd function with period , then the Fourier Half Range sine series of f is defined to be

In the formula we have

Cosine series
If  is an even function with a period , then the Fourier cosine series is defined to be

where

Remarks
This notion can be generalized to functions which are not even or odd, but then the above formulas will look different.

See also
Fourier series
Fourier analysis
Least-squares spectral analysis

Bibliography
 
 

Fourier series